Sudachi (Citrus sudachi; Japanese: スダチ or 酢橘) is a small, round, green citrus fruit of Japanese origin that is a specialty of Tokushima Prefecture in Japan. It is a sour citrus, not eaten as fruit, but used as food flavoring in place of lemon or lime. Genetic analysis shows it to be the product of a cross between a yuzu and another citrus akin to the koji and tachibana orange.

General
Cultivated for centuries in parts of Japan, and perhaps nearly as well known as the yuzu in that country, it has been considered an "indispensable companion" to eating matsutake mushroom. The , the squeezed citrus juice used as an alternative to vinegar, uses sudachi among other bitter oranges (kabosu or yuzu juices, and daidai) as an ingredient.

The fruit is also the specialty and symbol of the prefecture of Tokushima, which produces 98% of the fruit sudachi in Japan. The top producing communities are the township of Kamiyama-cho and the village of Sanagouchi-son, which placed 1st and 2nd place according to 2008 statistics with a combined share of almost half of the prefecture's annual production. The plant has white flowers which bloom in May and June. The fruits form in bunches, or tight clusters, and are harvested in the fall. Though sudachi fruits will eventually develop a yellow-orange rind color, they are normally harvested and used while still green. They contain large smooth seeds, containing a green polyembryo.

The sour sudachi is not consumed as whole fruit, but normally squeezed like a lemon or lime to flavor food. A half-slice of this fruit is served as garnish with many traditional Japanese dishes which include fish, soba, udon, nabe, and even some alcoholic beverages. It is considered to have a zestier flavor and aroma than lemons or limes. It also boasts a higher calcium and ascorbic acid (vitamin C) content than lemons. Sudachi flavored products (such as ice cream, vodka coolers, ice pops, and soft drinks) can also be found in Japan, particularly in Tokushima Prefecture, where the fruit is sold cheaply. The actual fruit is regarded as a delicacy in other parts of Japan, and is often expensive.

Some California farms now grow sudachi on a commercial level, after trees became readily available to nurseries around 2008. The fruit is being cultivated in Piura, Peru, as well.

Classification

Its species name was published by Mitsutaro Shirai (1933), but most modern scientists, even while still using this nomenclature by habit or as legacy, do not consider it as a bona fide species, but a cultivar or a hybrid of uncertain parentage. Tyozaburo Tanaka's assumption that the sudachi is a hybrid of yuzu appears to be supported by DNA studies; recent genetic analysis has confirmed its status as a hybrid, with one parent being the yuzu, and the other an unidentified relative of two native-Japanese cultivars, the koji and tachibana orange.

The sudachi was classed within the Papeda subgenus in the Swingle scheme, and in the more complicated Tyozaburo Tanaka scheme within the Eusmocitrus or true yuzu subgenus, under the Osmocitrus or yuzu section.

Phytochemistry

The flavonoid eriocitrin abundant in lemon and lime juices is present in comparable concentrations in sudachi juice, but is lacking in yuzu or kabosu juices.  Also, neoeriocitrin (characteristic in bergamot daidai) is found in sudachi juice and rind. Eriocitrin is an antioxidant reported to combat lipid peroxidation and like neoeriocitrin is said to block the formation of lipoxygenases involved in allergies and atherosclerosis.

Also, the flavonoid narirutin is said to be the active chemical in the Wakayama Prefecture specialty citrus jabara juice that is said to diminish the effects of pollen allergies. The jabara advertises that it contains 6 times the narirutin in yuzu, but sudachi juice also contains about 3 times as much as yuzu juice (20.1 mg per 100 ml, vs. 6.6 mg). This substance is quite abundant in the rind of yuzu and kabosu.

The ability of the sudachi to promote the body's calcium absorption has been studied as well.

In 2006, a Tokushima University research team published a report which suggests that the fruit may be effective in lowering glucose levels in diabetic patients. The team gave rats sudachi zest over a one-year period and found that their glucose levels were lowered, with signs of improved health in the rats.

References
Footnotes

Bibliography

 Sudachi at Citrus Variety Collection 
 
 

Citrus
Citrus hybrids
Japanese fruit